The Altai people, also the Altaians, are a Turkic ethnic group of indigenous peoples of Siberia mainly living in the Altai Republic, Russia. Several thousand of the Altaians also live in Mongolia (Mongolian Altai Mountains) and China (Altay Prefecture, northern Xinjiang) but are officially unrecognized as a distinct group and listed under the name "Oirats" as a part of the Mongols, as well as in Kazakhstan where they number around 200. For alternative ethnonyms see also Tele, Black Tatar, and Oirats. During the Northern Yuan Dynasty of Mongolia, they were ruled in the administrative area known as Telengid Province.

Ethnic groups and subgroups

The Altaians are represented by two ethnographic groups:

The Southern Altaians, who speak the Southern Altai language with its dialects, include the Altai-Kizhi, Teleuts, and Telengits. The Telesy were previously included but are now assimilated into the Telengits.
The Northern Altaians, who speak the Northern Altai language and dialects, include the Chelkans, Kumandins, and Tubalars (Tuba-Kizhi).

The Northern and Southern Altaians formed in the Altai area on the basis of tribes of Kimek-Kipchaks.

In the Soviet years and until 2000, the authorities considered the northern Altaians and the Teleuts to be part of the Altai people. Currently, according to the Resolution of the Government of the Russian Federation No. 255 dated March 24, 2000, the Chelkans, Kumandins, Telengits, Teleuts, and Tubalars were recognized as separate ethnic groups as well as the indigenous small-numbered peoples of the North, Siberia and the Far East. However, in the 2010 Russian Census, the only recognized distinct ethnic groups are the Kumandins and Teleuts.

History

Recent linguistic, genetic and archaeological evidence suggests that the earliest Turkic peoples descended from agricultural communities in Northeast China who moved westwards into Mongolia in the late 3rd millennium BC, where they adopted a pastoral lifestyle. By the early 1st millennium BC, these peoples had become equestrian nomads. In subsequent centuries, the steppe populations of Central Asia appear to have been progressively replaced and Turkified by East Asian nomadic Turks, moving out of Mongolia.

There were heterogeneous ethnic settlements during the Bronze and Iron Age in the region where the Altai people live today. From the fifth century BC and onwards Turkic peoples settled in the area and soon began to blend with the prior populations. The region was then conquered or became within the sphere of influence of the Xiongnu, the Rouran Khaganate, the Turkic Khanganate, the Uyghur Empire, and the Yenisei Kyrgyz. During these time periods the area's local people became Turkicized culturally and linguistically.

According to one study in 2016, the Altaians, precisely some southern Altaians, assimilated local Yeniseian people which were closely related to the Paleo-Eskimo groups.

From the thirteenth to eighteenth century the Altai people were dominated politically and culturally by the Mongols. The origin of the southern Altaians can be traced during this period from the result of the mixing of Kipchak and Mongol tribes. Meanwhile, the Northern Altaians were a result of the fusion of Turkic tribes with Samoyeds, Kets and other Siberian groups.

The Altaians were annexed by the Four Oirat of Western Mongols in the 16th century. The Mongols called them "Telengid" or "Telengid aimag" in the period of the Northern Yuan dynasty, with the region known as Telengid Province.  After the fall of the Zunghar Khanate in the 18th century, the Altaians were subjugated by the Qing Dynasty, which referred to them as Altan Nuur Uriyangkhai. Altaians are genetically related to the Uriyangkhai, which is a common neighbouring Oirat Mongol ethnic group in Mongolia.

The Altai came into contact with Russians in the 18th century. In the tsarist period, the Altai were known as oirot or oyrot (this name means oirat and would later be carried on for the Oyrot Autonomous Oblast). The Altai report that many of them became addicted to the Russians' vodka, which they called "fire water".

With regard to religion, some of the Altai remained shamanists and others (in a trend beginning in the mid-19th century) have converted to the Russian Orthodox Church. The Altai mission was developed under Saint Makarii Glukharev († 1847), known as the 'Apostle to the Altai'. In 1904, a millenarian indigenist religious movement called Ak Jang or Burkhanism arose among these people.

Prior to 1917 the Altai were considered to be made up of many different ethnic groups.

With the rise of the 1917 revolution, the Altai attempted to make in 1918 their region a separate Burkhanist republic called the Confederated Republic of Altai (Karakorum-Altai Region).. Their support for the Mensheviks during the Civil War led to the venture's collapse after the Bolshevik victory and the later rise of Joseph Stalin. In the 1940s, during World War II and when he was directing numerous purges, his government accused the Altai of being pro-Japanese. The word "oyrot" was declared to be counterrevolutionary. By 1950, Soviet industrialization policies and development in this area resulted in considerable migration of Russians to this republic, reducing the proportion of Altai in the total population from 50% to 20%. In the early 21st century, ethnic Altaians make up about 31% of the Altai Republic's population.

Today, the special interests of the Altaians are articulated and defended by the Association of Northern Ethnoses of Altai.

Demographics

According to the 2010 Russian census, there was a total of 69,963 Altaians who resided within the Altai Republic. This represented 34.5% of the total population of the republic, compared with 56.6% with a Russian background, Altaian families are the majority only in certain villages. However, Altaian culture is still the local culture between people and communities.

Culture

Traditional lifestyle 

The Southern Altaians were mostly nomadic or semi-nomadic livestock holders. They raised horses, goats, sheep, and cattle. The Northern Altaians mainly engaged in hunting as their primary form of subsistence. Their main prey were animals from the taiga (boreal forests). However, some Altaians also engaged in small scale agriculture, gathering, and fishing.

Dwellings 

Most of the Southern Altaians traditionally lived in yurts. Many Northern Altaians mainly built polygonal yurts with conic roofs made out of logs and bark. Some Altai-Kizhi also lived in mud huts with birch bark gable roofs and log or plank walling. The Teleuts and a few Northern Altaians lived in conic homes made out of perches or bark. With the influx of Russians near the homeland of the Altaians, there was an increase of the construction of large huts with two to four slope roofs in consequence of Russian influence.

Despite the many social and political changes the Altaians have endured, many modern and settled families still keep a yurt in their yards. These yurts are usually used as a summertime kitchen or extra room.

Clothing 

The traditional clothing of Southern Altaian men and women are very similar with little differences between the two. Average clothing consisted of long shirts with wide breeches, oriental robes, and sleeves. Other apparel often included fur hats, high boots, and sheepskin coats. Northern Altaians and some Teleuts traditionally wore short breeches, linen shirts, and single-breasted oriental robes. Despite the fact that most Altaians today wear modern clothes, traditional wear still remains in use.

Cuisine 
Altaian cuisine consists of soups of horseflesh or mutton. Dishes with gopher, badger, martmot, fermented milk, cream (from boiled milk), blood pudding, butter, fried barley flour, and certain vegetables are also staples of Altaian cuisine. Popular drinks include aryki (hard liquor made from kumis).

Religion

History 

Traditional Altaian shamanism is rich with mythology and supernatural beings. Popular deities included Yerlik, the god of the underworld and Oyrot-Khan, a sagely and heroic figure who is a composite blend taken from historical Zungarian (Oirat) Khans and ancient legendary heroes. However, with many migrations, settlement changes, and the presence of the Russians and their eventual union with the Russian Empire, the Altaians encountered three world religions: Islam, Buddhism, and Christianity. At first, the Altaians were indifferent and at times even hostile to these faiths and their expansion. In 1829, an Orthodox mission was founded in the region (modern Altai Republic) soon after the region became a protectorate of the Russian Empire. Orthodox missionaries regularly confiscated land from Altaians who refused to convert. Altaians were often forcefully converted to Christianity. 

Mongolian Buddhist missionaries attempted to spread the faith among the Altaians during the 19th century. The Buddhist missionaries also encouraged the Altaians to unite together against the Russians. However, their activities and preaching were suppressed by the Russian state and Christian missionaries. Buddhism made little headway among the Altaians but many Buddhist ideas and principles entered into Altaian spiritual thought. However, some Altaians reportedly visited Mongolia and studied at Buddhist centers before and after the rise of the Burkhanist movement in the early 20th century; indicating a significant Buddhist influence on the new religion. 

The mission and its missionaries were initially culturally sensitive and tolerant to the Altaians and their customs. However, the rise of Russian nationalism during the late nineteenth century caused the Russification of Orthodox Christianity and the mostly Russian clergy in Siberia also took up the ideology. This created intolerant views of the natives of Siberia (including the Altaians) and of their culture. This led to the rejection of Christianity by many Altaians who saw it as a foreign Russian religion. However, Russian rule continued to grow increasingly strict both politically and religiously.

Around 1904, the development of Burkhanism among the Altaians was underway. Burkhanism is a monotheistic religion named after Ak-Burkhan, a deity who is believed and recognized by its adherents to have been the sole god. Burkhanism was opposed to both the Russians and the traditional shamans. The hostility towards the shamans was so great that the shamans had to seek protection from Russian authorities. The rise of the Bolsheviks in the first quarter of the twentieth century also led to the brutal repression of all religions which included the faiths in the Altai region. For the next few decades, most religions basically vanished with only shamanistic and ancient polytheistic beliefs surviving the chaos. This was believed to have occurred because ancient religious beliefs could be easily orally transmitted from generation to another. It's also likely that no Burkhanist texts survived the repression and main sources for the beliefs of the religion come from Russian missionaries, travellers, and scholars.

Modern spirituality 
Recently, Burkhanism and shamanism has seen a revival in the Altai region which is especially popular among Altaian youth. According to recent statistical studies, up to 70 % or 86 % (data of the Research State Institute of Altaic Studies) of the Altaians continue to profess "Altai Faith": Burkhanism, shamanism and other native spiritual cults and traditions. According to Natalia Zhukovskaia, the Altaian shamanism is supreme religion of the majority of the Altai people.

At present, shamanism is practiced by many Telengits though there is a large amount that also profess Orthodox Christianity. Burkhanism is the main religion of the Altai-Kizhi, a largest Altaians' group, but there is a significant number of Orthodox Christians. The majority of Kumandins, Tubalars, Teleuts, and Chelkans are Russian Orthodox although there is a significant minority that practice shamanism. A few Altaians are Evangelical Christians, and Tibetan Buddhists.

In principle, the division into the Burkhanists and shamanists has ceased to be relevant for the contemporary religiosity of the Altaians. According to a number of studies, by the beginning of the 21st century, there were practically no traditional shamans or classical Burkhanists anti-shamanists. The main one was the single "Altai Faith"—a traditional ethnic religion in the form of a synthesis of Burkhanism with the remnants of shamanism and other tribal beliefs and customs.

Genetics 
Altai population can be divided into northern and southern clusters based on linguistics, culture, and genetics. According to a 2012 study that analyzed mtDNA (by PCR-RFLP analysis and control region sequencing) and nonrecombinant Y-DNA (by scoring more than 100 biallelic markers and 17 Y-STRs) obtained from Altaian samples,  northern Altaians are genetically more similar to Yeniseian, Ugric, and Samoyeds to the north, while southern Altaians having greater affinities to other Turkic speaking populations of southern Siberia and Central Asia. The same study conducted a high-resolution analysis of Y chromosome Haplogroup Q-M242 that was found in Altaian samples and concluded that southern Altaians and indigenous peoples of the Americas share a recent common ancestor.

In accordance with a new study by Russian geneticists, the genetic isolation of the northern and southern Altaians is undeniable. The southern Altaians are dominated by such variants of the Y chromosome haplogroup as Q-M242 and R1a, and there are also I-M170 and O-M175. Within the northern Altaians, the R1a haplogroup is dominant, Q-M242 is rarely found, and I-M170 and O-M175 are not found at all.

See also
Altai languages
Altai Mountains
Altai Republic
Altay Prefecture
Govi-Altai Province
Altay Airport
Altay City
Shamanism in Siberia

References

Citations

Sources 

 
 
 
 
 
 
    Text was copied from this source, which is available under a  Creative Commons Attribution 4.0 International License.

External links

 NUPI – Centre for Russian Studies profile
 The legend of Altay

 
Altai Mountains
Ethnic groups in Russia
Indigenous peoples of the Altai Republic
Indigenous peoples of North Asia
Modern nomads